The transport network in Uruguay consists of 1,673 km of rail network, 7,743 km of paved roads, 1,600 km of navigable waterways, and 11 airports with paved roads.

Railways

Passenger services

Regular passenger services are operated between Montevideo and 25 de Agosto (63 km) since August 26, 1993 (previously all regular passenger services were withdrawn on January 2, 1988). One daily train was extended to San José (96 km from Montevideo) on January 15, 2007, and another was extended from 25 de Agosto to Florida (109 km from Montevideo) on January 2, 2008. Another line, which operates between Montevideo and Ingeniero Victor Sudriers, was reopened on December 15, 2005 (44 km).

International links
 There is a  freight rail connection with  Argentina (Argentina) over the Salto Grande Dam
 There is a connection with  Brazil (Brazil) which includes freight transshipment because of gauge difference ( to ) at Santana do Livramento.

Future
The state railway administration AFE has announced that starting January, 2010, 419 km of track will be renewed on the Pintado-Rivera section of the central main line and part of the international branch from Rivera to Santana do Livramento, north of Chamberlain using Russian rail given in lieu of a debt.  The programme will cost $30m.

Roadways
Total roadways: 
Paved roadways: 
Unpaved:  (2010)

National Roads

 R1 Montevideo - Colonia del Sacramento
 R2 Rosario - Mercedes - Fray Bentos, border with Argentina.
 R3 Villa María - Trinidad - Paysandú - Salto - Bella Unión, border with Brazil.
 R5 Montevideo - Canelones - Durazno - Tacuarembó - Rivera, border with Brazil.
 R7 Montevideo - Fray Marcos - Melo
 R8 Montevideo - Minas - Treinta y Tres - Melo - Aceguá, border with Brazil.
 R9 Horno Mulato - Rocha - Chuy, border with Brazil.
 R11 Atlántida - Canelones - Eclida Paullier
 R26 Paysandú, border with Argentina - Tacuarembó - Melo - Río Branco, border with Brazil.

Motorways

Uruguay has a small network of motorways, owing to the low demand due to sparse population outside the capital. The few highways with 4 lanes are:

 Ruta 1: Montevideo - Colonia del Sacramento. Length: .
 Ruta Interbalnearia: Montevideo - Punta del Este. Length: .
 Ruta Gral. Fructuoso Rivera: Montevideo - Canelones. Length: .

Fuel stations

The traditional fuel stations were Ancap, Esso, Shell and Texaco. In 2005–2006, Petrobras bought the 90 Shell stations. In 2006–2007, Ancap bought the 90 Texaco stations. In 2011, Bridas bought the Esso stations but kept the brand.

Waterways
Uruguay has 1,600 km of waterways.

Ports and harbors
Uruguay has a number of ports and harbors including: Montevideo (its major port), Fray Bentos, Nueva Palmira, Paysandú, La Paloma, Juan Lacaze, Carmelo, Conchillas, Salto, Punta del Este, Colonia del Sacramento, Piriápolis, Mercedes.

Airports

Uruguay had a total of 94 airfields as of 2012, 11 of which have paved runways. The country is primarily served by the Carrasco International Airport in Canelones Department, next to the limit with Montevideo. Handing just over 1.5 million passengers a year, its operating traffic is significantly lighter than others in the region such as Buenos Aires-Ezeiza and São Paulo-Guarulhos.

Airports - with paved runways:
total:
11
over 3,047 m:
1
1,524 to 2,437 m:
4
914 to 1,523 m:
4
under 914 m:
2 (2013)

Airports - with unpaved runways:
total:
122
1,524 to 2,437 m:
3
914 to 1,523 m:
40
under 914 m:
79 (2013)

National airlines
Air Class Líneas Aéreas
Amaszonas Uruguay currently not flying because of the COVID-19 pandemic

Exctinct airlines
BQB Líneas Aéreas ceased operations on April 11, 2015 
Uair Ceased operation on 2005
Alas Uruguay ceased operations on October 24, 2016
PLUNA ceased operations on July 5, 2012.

Pipelines
As of 2010, Uruguay has 257 km of natural gas pipeline and 160 km of oil line.

See also
 Rail transport by country

References

External links